Anna Minerva Henderson (1887–1987) was a teacher, civil servant, and poet from Saint John, New Brunswick. According to the New Brunswick Black History Society, during Canada's centennial in 1967 she published a "chaplet" containing 22 poems which is believed to be the first book to be published by a Black woman who was born in Canada. In 2004, Henderson and New Brunswick publisher Abraham Beverley Walker were the subject of the 2004 W. Stewart MacNutt Memorial Lecture at the University of New Brunswick by George Elliot Clarke who at the time was serving as the Poet Laureate of Toronto. In 2006, Clarke published "Anna Minerva Henderson: An Afro-New Brunswick Response to Canadian (Modernist) Poetry" in the journal Canadian Literature, based upon this lecture.

Early life and career
Anna Minerva Henderson was born in 1887 in Saint John, New Brunswick to schoolteacher Henrietta Leake and an African American soldier and barber who died in 1893. Anna graduated from Saint John High School in 1905. She earned her teacher's certificate, but was barred from teaching in Halifax or Saint John on account of her race. She taught in Black communities in  Nova Scotia for two years. She was hired by the Civil Service of Canada in 1912 after receiving the third highest grade in the Dominion of Canada on the entrance test. She worked for the Department of the Interior's Dominion Lands Branch as a stenographer. In 1938 she worked for the Department of Mines and Resources' immigration branch, employed as principal clerk. Henderson worked as a stenographer for the Saint John law firm Fairweather & Stevenson in 1945.

Henderson wrote "The Colymn" an Ottawa Citizen column and was published in magazines by the 1930s. Canadian Poetry Magazine published her sonnet "Parliament Hill, Ottawa" in 1937. She self-published her 31-page chapbook Citadel in 1967. She took a creative writing course from the University of New Brunswick in 1974.

Death and legacy
Henderson died in 1987 and was interred at Fernhill Cemetery on July 21, 1987.

In 2021, as part of their Being Black in Canada feature the CBC produced an article focused on Hendersen titled "Restoring the legacy of a 'trailblazing' Black Saint John writer" that focused on Hendersen's life as an educator, civil servant and author, and on the research currently underway to further explore and promote her legacy as an African-Canadian author.

References

1887 births
1987 deaths
Canadian women poets
Canadian columnists
Canadian women columnists
Canadian women civil servants
Writers from Saint John, New Brunswick
20th-century Canadian civil servants
20th-century Canadian poets
20th-century Canadian women writers